Saint-André-le-Puy is a commune in the Loire department in central France.

Location

Population

Miscellaneous
Puy derives from the Provençal word "Puech", meaning an isolated hill.
It rejected the proposed European Constitution by 60%.

See also
Communes of the Loire department

References

External links
All sites in French, unless otherwise indicated
 Weather for Saint-André-le-Puy
  Financial Data  for Saint-André-le-Puy from the Ministry of the Economy, Finances and Industry
 Picture of the belltower of the parish church

Map links
 Map of Saint-André-le-Puy on the Institut Géographique National site
 Saint-André-le-Puy on the Cassini map

Communes of Loire (department)